Pont-de-Roide-Vermondans (before 2014: Pont-de-Roide) is a commune in the Doubs département in the Bourgogne-Franche-Comté region in eastern France.

Geography
The town is at the heart of the Pays de Lomont,  from Montbéliard at the confluence of the rivers Doubs, Ranceuse, and Roide; it is therefore located at the crossroad of different valleys. On the east end of the town are high cliffs known as les Roches, leading to a plateau near the Franco-Swiss border.

History
In 1973, the adjacent village of Vermondans joined the commune of Pont-de-Roide. In 2013 the fusion was made official by the creation of a new commune: Pont-de-Roide - Vermondans.

Population

See also
 Communes of the Doubs department
 US Pont-de-Roide
 Armand Machabey (1886–1966), musicologist, born in Pont-de-Roide-Vermondans

References

External links

 Official Web site 

Communes of Doubs